Electric Ladyland is a museum located in the Jordaan area of Amsterdam, Netherlands. It is devoted to presenting art, minerals, and manufactured items that fluoresce under ultraviolet light. It opened on April 19, 1999 and was the first museum devoted to fluorescence.

References

External links 
 Electric Ladyland - museum website

Museums in Amsterdam